Breakwell is a surname. Notable people with the surname include:

Arthur Breakwell (1881–1930), English footballer
David Breakwell (born 1946), former English cricketer
Dennis Breakwell (born 1948), former English first-class cricketer
Glynis Breakwell, DBE (born 1952), the Vice-Chancellor of the University of Bath in Bath, England
Ian Breakwell (1943–2005), British fine artist
John V. Breakwell (1917–1991), American control theorist and a Professor of Astronautics at Stanford University
Spike Breakwell (born 1968), British comedian
Thomas Breakwell (1872–1902), the first Englishmen to become a Bahá’í
Tom Breakwell (1915–unknown), an English professional footballer